

Critical reception

The Ricky Martin Video Collection is a collection of 9 videos by Puerto Rican singer Ricky Martin. It was released on 5 October 1999, by Columbia Music Video in VHS and DVD formats, includes its best-known song, Livin' la Vida Loca as well as his other greatest hits María and his live Grammy performance of The Cup of Life, the official song of the 1998 FIFA World Cup in France.

Commercial performance
In the United States, the DVD peaked at number 1 on the Billboard Top Music Videos chart and was later certified platinum by the Recording Industry Association of America (RIAA) for selling of 100,000 copies. Also in Canada was certified 6× Platinum by the Music Canada for shipments of 60,000 copies and was certified gold by the British Phonographic Industry (BPI) for selling of 25,000 copies in the United Kingdom.

Track listing

Charts and certifications

Charts

Certifications

Release history

References

Ricky Martin video albums
1999 video albums
Live video albums